Dr. Ali Saad (b. Damascus, 1953) is a former Minister of Education in Syria, an Elected Member of the Central Committee, and a member of the Baath Party. He holds a Ph.D. degree in psychology from the University of Bucharest.

References

External links
Veiled order bans niqab in Syrian classrooms, Phil Sands, The National, 8 July 2010
Syria's niqab ban is part of a clash within Islam itself, Faisal al Yafai, Cif Belief at The Guardian, 19 July 2011
Syria bans niqab from universities, AP, The Guardian, 20 July 2010
Syria relaxes veil ban for teachers, AP, 6 April 2011
Q&A: Ali Sa'ad Minister of Education, Dalia Haidar, Syria Today, February 2011

1953 births
Living people
Syrian ministers of education
University of Bucharest alumni
Damascus University alumni
People from Damascus
Arab Socialist Ba'ath Party – Syria Region politicians